Carabus lefebvrei is a species of bluish-black coloured ground beetle in the Carabinae subfamily, that is endemic to Sicily.

Subspecies
There are only 2 subspecies:
Carabus lefebvrei bayardi Solier, 1835
Carabus lefebvrei lefebvrei Dejean, 1826

References

lefebvrei
Beetles described in 1826
Endemic fauna of Sicily
Beetles of Europe